This is a list of CAS numbers by chemical formulas and chemical compounds, indexed by formula.The CAS number is a unique number applied to a specific chemical by the Chemical Abstracts Service (CAS).This list complements alternative listings to be found at list of inorganic compounds and glossary of chemical formulae.

A

B

C

D

E

F

G

H

I

K

L

M

N

O

P

R

S

T

U

V

W

X

Y

Z

See also

External links
PubChem Search
Webelements
ATSDR Toxic Substances
Common Chemistry – Most common substances from Chemical Abstracts Service
CAS numbers list from ChemSynthesis service

Chemical compounds
CAS numbers by chemical compound

ro:Număr registru CAS